Purch Group, Inc. was a New York City-based digital media company. Originally established in 2003 as  TechMedia Network, Inc., it was positioned as a "portfolio of brands and products focused on purchasing decisions"—consisting primarily of websites focusing on reviews of consumer electronics, positioned to marketers as outlets to "directly engage with buyers in the right place, at the right time".

In 2018, Purch sold its consumer brands to Future plc. Its business-to-business unit Business.com was not included in the sale.

History

In 2009, Purch, then known as TechMedia Network, Inc. acquired LiveScience, Space.com and Newsarama from Imaginova. Two years later, TechMedia Network acquired Laptop Magazine from Bedford Communications. In July 2013, the company acquired Bestofmedia Group, publisher of Tom's Hardware, Tom's Guide, Tom's IT Pro, Anandtech and a variety of sister publications across Europe. TechMedia Network, Inc. acquired BuyerZone.com, LLC from Reed Business Information in early 2014.

In April 2014, TechMedia Network. changed its name to Purch and simultaneously announced an exclusive partnership with Mobile Nations, a portfolio of mobile-focused online communities. In December 2014, Purch announced the acquisition of AnandTech and in March 2015 the company announced the acquisition of mobile shopping app Consumr, which was rebranded that following July as Purchx. Included in the rebrand was the launch of the Purch Marketplace, where shoppers can browse and buy technology products and services online. In September 2015, Purch acquired Active Junky, a loyalty program and online shopping site for outdoor gear. This was followed by the December 2015 acquisition of ShopSavvy, a mobile shopping app.

Purch's 2015 round of funding ($135 million) was led by Canso Investment Counsel. Purch has received additional funding from ABS Capital Partners, Village Ventures, and Highway 12 Ventures. Purch was headquartered in New York City, where Greg Mason served as CEO.

In 2018, Purch announced that it would sell its consumer brands to British media company Future plc for $132.5 million. Its business-to-business operations were retained under the Business.com banner (which it had acquired in 2016).

List of websites
The company owned and operated the following websites:
 Active Junky
 AnandTech
 Consumr
 Herman Street
 Laptop Mag
 LiveScience
 Newsarama
 ShopSavvy
 Space.com
 Tom's Guide
 Tom's Guide (France)
 Tom's Hardware
 Tom's Hardware (France)
 Tom's Hardware (Italy)
 Tom's Hardware (UK)
 Tom's IT Pro
 Top Ten Reviews

Following websites were not included during the sale to Future, and went under Business.com:

 Business News Daily
 Business.com
 BuyerZone

References

External links

Digital media
Mass media companies of the United States
2018 disestablishments in New York (state)
2018 mergers and acquisitions